Stoddard may refer to:

Places
In the United States:
Stoddard, Nebraska
Stoddard, New Hampshire
Stoddard, Wisconsin
Stoddard County, Missouri

Other uses
Stoddard (surname)

See also
Stoddard-Dayton, the automobile
Stoddard engine, a heat engine
Stoddard-Hamilton Aircraft
USS Stoddard (DD-566), U.S. Navy destroyer
Stoddart, a surname
White spirit, also known as Stoddard Solvent